Wakaf Bharu–Kota Bharu–Kubang Kerian Highway or WKK Highway (Lebuhraya WKK), Federal Route 3, is a major highway in Kota Bharu, Kelantan, Malaysia.

Kota Bharu flyover is the first flyover built in Kota Bharu. It was constructed between 2009 and 2012.

Interchanges and junctions (south-north)

Highways in Malaysia